Onu is a neopronoun in the Polish language intended as a gender-neutral pronoun, and an alternative to the gender-specific pronouns on ("he"), and ona ("she"). It is not officially accepted by the Polish Language Council.

History 
The Polish language does not have a personal gender-neutral pronoun recognized by the Polish Language Council. The most popular neopronoun, created to address nonbinary people, is onu. It was originally coined by science fiction and fantasy writer Jacek Dukaj, for his 2004 book Perfect Imperfection. From the surname of the author, this, and similar neopronouns created by him, are referred to as dukaizmy, and after term coined by him, also known as the "post-gender pronouns" (Polish: zaimki postpłciowe). Since its introduction, the pronouns had been gaining more and more popularity, being used in literary works, media, and in daily conversations.

Declination

See also 
 Gender neutrality in languages with gendered third-person pronouns

References 

Gender-neutral pronouns
2004 neologisms
Polish language
Polish grammar
LGBT culture in Poland